William Donald may refer to:

Willie Donald (1953–2022), Scottish cricketer and administrator
Bill Donald (1899–1987), Australian rules footballer